The Men's Marathon at the 1995 World Championships in Gothenburg, Sweden was held on Saturday August 12, 1995.

Medalists

Abbreviations
All times shown are in hours:minutes:seconds

Records

Intermediates

Final ranking

See also
 1995 Marathon Year Ranking
 Men's Olympic Marathon (1996)

References
 Results
 IAAF

M
Marathons at the World Athletics Championships
1995 marathons
Men's marathons
Marathons in Sweden